Maria Mercè Roca i Perich (b. Portbou, Spain, July 19, 1958) is a Catalan writer and politician from Spain. She was deputy to the Parliament of Catalonia for Republican Left of Catalonia, and currently serves as a councillor at the City Council of Girona for the same party.

Biography 
At age 16, Roca moved to Girona, where she ended up establishing her residence. Although she did not finish her studies on Catalan Philology, she worked for many years as a Catalan teacher. In the mid-1980s, she rose in the Catalan cultural panorama when she was awarded the Víctor Català prize. She continued her literary activity with a number of tales, novels and also a script for the TV series Secrets de família, broadcast by TV3. Her career has always had a lot of success, both with literary prizes and translations into several languages, including Spanish, Basque, French, German and Dutch.

Roca is vice-president of the Associació d'Escriptors en Llengua Catalana.

She is always been active in politics –she was deputy at the Parliament of Catalonia, where she was President of the Culture Commission (2007-2010)– for Republican Left of Catalonia (ERC) party between 2003 and 2010.

She was a candidate to the City council of Girona for (ERC) at the 2015 Spanish municipal elections, where ERC got 4 councillors, among which Roca was one of them.

Roca was one of the promoters of the platform Sobirania i Progrés. In 2022 she was appointed dean of the Institució de les Lletres Catalanes, a public body promoting catalan literature.

Work

Short stories 
1986 Ben Estret
1986 Sort que hi ha l'horitzó
1987 El col·leccionista de somnis
1988 La veu del foc
1988 Capitells
1994 L'escrivent i altres contes
2001 Contes personals: Tria a cura de Carles Cortès
2006 Kenitra

Novels 
1987 Els arbres vençuts
1987 El present que m'acull
1988 Perfum de nard
1988 Com un miratge
1990 La casa gran
1990 Temporada baixa
1992 Greuges infinits
1993 Cames de seda
1998 L'àngel del vespre
1999 Temps de perdre
2000 Delictes d'amor
2002 Una mare com tu
2003 L'últim tren
2005 Els dies difícils
2011 Bones Intencions

Non-fiction 
2001 El món era a fora (interviews)
2005 Coses que fan que la vida valgui la pena

Prizes 
1985 Víctor Català prize for Sort que hi ha l'horitzó
1986 Josep Pla Award for El present que m'acull
1992 Sant Jordi prize for Cames de seda
2000 Ramon Llull Novel Award for Delictes d'amor
2012 Barcanova prize for Mil revolts

Notes

External links 
 
 Maria Mercè Roca at Associació d'Escriptors en Llengua Catalana
 Maria Mercè Roca at ''Qui és Qui de les Llengües Catalanes

Republican Left of Catalonia politicians
Women writers from Catalonia
Novelists from Catalonia
1958 births
Living people
Spanish women writers
Catalan-language writers